John Joseph Malone (22 December 1919 – 11 December 2001) was an Australian rules footballer who played with Footscray in the Victorian Football League (VFL).

He served in the Royal Australian Air Force during World War II.

Notes

External links 
		

1919 births
2001 deaths
Australian rules footballers from Victoria (Australia)
Western Bulldogs players